Mission Institution is a minimum and medium security federal institution within the Correctional Service of Canada and is located in Mission, British Columbia.  It has a capacity of 540 inmates:  324 in medium security and 216 in minimum security.  Mission Institution is broken up into 5 living units, with an additional 10 cell segregation unit that also accommodates inmates from neighboring Ferndale Institution. Mission Institution has several industries building, allowing inmates to be employed to build numerous products, including CORCAN furniture and restoring bicycles for the Bikes for Kids program.

The institution was the site of a COVID-19 outbreak, where at least 133 inmates and staff had tested positive for the virus, with one death. The Provincial Health Services Authority's Mobile Medical Unit (MMU) was set up in a secure area at Abbotsford Regional Hospital, in order to assist with controlling the outbreak.

References

External link
Institution profile at Corrections Canada

Correctional Service of Canada institutions
Prisons in British Columbia
Mission, British Columbia